The siege of Savannah or the Second Battle of Savannah was an encounter of the American Revolutionary War (1775–1783) in 1779. The year before, the city of Savannah, Georgia, had been captured by a British expeditionary corps under Lieutenant-Colonel Archibald Campbell. The siege itself consisted of a joint Franco-American attempt to retake Savannah, from September 16 to October 18, 1779. On October 9 a major assault against the British siege works failed. During the attack, Polish nobleman Count Casimir Pulaski, leading the combined cavalry forces on the American side, was mortally wounded. With the failure of the joint attack, the siege was abandoned, and the British remained in control of Savannah until July 1782, near the end of the war.

In 1779, more than 500 recruits from Saint-Domingue (the French colony which later became Haiti), under the overall command of French nobleman Charles Hector, Comte d'Estaing, fought alongside American colonial troops against the British Army during the siege of Savannah. This was one of the most significant foreign contributions to the American Revolutionary War. This French-colonial force had been established six months earlier and was led by white officers. Recruits came from the black population and included free men of color as well as slaves seeking their freedom in exchange for their service.

Background
Following the failures of military campaigns in the northern United States earlier in the American Revolutionary War, British military planners decided to embark on a southern strategy to conquer the rebellious colonies, with the support of Loyalists in the South. Their first step was to gain control of the southern ports of Savannah, Georgia and Charleston, South Carolina. An expedition in December 1778 took Savannah with modest resistance from ineffective militia and Continental Army defenses.

The Continental Army regrouped, and by June 1779 the combined army and militia forces guarding Charleston numbered between 5,000 and 7,000 men. General Benjamin Lincoln, commanding those forces, knew that he could not recapture Savannah without naval assistance; for this he turned to the French, who had entered the war as an American ally in 1778.
French Admiral the Comte d'Estaing spent the first part of 1779 in the Caribbean, where his fleet and a British fleet monitored each other's movements. He took advantage of conditions to capture Grenada in July before acceding to American requests for support in operations against Savannah. On September 3—an uncharacteristically early arrival as there was still substantial risk of seasonal hurricanes—a few French ships arrived at Charleston with news that d'Estaing was sailing for Georgia with twenty-five ships of the line and 4,000 French troops. Lincoln and the French emissaries agreed on a plan of attack on Savannah, and Lincoln left Charleston with over 2,000 men on September 11.

Order of Battle

Allies 
 Commanding General of Allied Forces, Major General Benjamin Lincoln

Continentals 
 Artillery & Engineers, commanded by Colonel B. Beckman
 4th South Carolina Regiment of Continental Artillery (1 coy)
 1st Brigade, commanded by Brigadier General Lachlan McIntosh
 3rd South Carolina Regiment (Rangers) – Cavalry (2 sqns)
 1st South Carolina Regiment – Infantry (1 small company)
 6th South Carolina Regiment (Rifles) – Riflemen (roughly one small coy)
 2nd Brigade, commanded by Brigadier General Isaac Huger
 Huger's Continental Regiment (4 coys)
 Skirving's South Carolina Militia (2 coys)
 Harden's South Carolina Militia (1 coy)
 Garden's South Carolina Militia (1 coy)
 Georgia Militia Brigade, commanded by Brigadier General Lachlan McIntosh
 Few's Georgia Militia (1 small coy)
 Dooley's Georgia Militia (1 coy)
 Twig's Georgia Militia (1 coy)
 Middleton's Georgia Militia (1 extremely reduced coy)
 Charleston Militia
 2nd Militia Brigade commanded by Colonel M. Simmons (2 coys)
 Light Troops commanded by Lieutenant colonel J. Laurens (1 strengthened coy)

French 
 Commanding Officer, Admiral Charles Henri Hector, Comte d'Estaing

The French expedition included detachments or full battalions from:
 Régiment de Champagne
 Régiment d'Auxerrois
 Régiment d'Agénois
 Régiment de Cambrésis
 Régiment de Hainaut (German)
 Régiment de Foix
 Dillon's_Regiment_(France)
 Régiment de Walsh (Irish)
 Régiment du Cap (colonial, Saint-Domingue)
 Régiment de La Martinique (colonial, Martinique)
 Régiment de La Guadeloupe (colonial, Guadeloupe)
 Régiment du Port–au–Prince (colonial, Saint-Domingue)
 Régiment de Metz (Artillery)

British 
 Commanding Officer, Major General Augustine Prévost
 16th Regiment of Foot
 71st Regiment of Foot (Fraser's Highlanders)
 South Carolina Dragoons (Provincial)
 New York Volunteers
 North Carolina Royalist Regiment (Provincial)
 1 Battalion from De Lancey's Brigade
 King's Rangers (South Carolinan, Provincial)
 2 German Regiments
 South Carolina Loyalist Militia
 Georgia Loyalist Militia
 Detachment of Royal Marines
 Detachment of Naval gunners serving in the naval battery
 Artillery
 100 guns, howitzers, and mortars part of the Savannah Defences, including a naval battery

Defence

British defenses
British troop strength in the area consisted of about 6,500 regulars at Brunswick, Georgia, another 900 at Beaufort, South Carolina, under Colonel John Maitland, and about 100 Loyalists at Sunbury, Georgia. General Augustine Prevost, in command of these troops from his base at Savannah, was caught unprepared when the French fleet began to arrive off Tybee Island near Savannah and recalled the troops stationed at Beaufort and Sunbury to aid in the city's defense.

Captain Moncrief of the Royal Engineers was tasked with constructing fortifications to repulse the invaders.

Vessels
They landed their guns and most of their men to reinforce the land forces. In addition, the British also deployed the armed brig  and the armed ship , the latter from the East Florida navy. There were two galleys,  and Thunder, also from East Florida. Lastly, the British armed two merchant vessels, Savannah and Venus.

Siege

D'Estaing began landing troops below the city on September 12, and began moving in by September 16. Confident of victory, and believing that Maitland's reinforcements would be prevented from reaching Savannah by Lincoln, he offered Prevost the opportunity to surrender. Prevost delayed, asking for 24 hours of truce. Owing to miscommunication about who was responsible for preventing Maitland's movements, the waterways separating South Carolina's Hilton Head Island from the mainland were left unguarded, and Maitland was able to reach Savannah hours before the truce ended. Prevost's response to d'Estaing's offer was a polite refusal, despite the arrival .

On 19 September, as Charles-Marie de Trolong du Rumain moved his squadron up the river, he exchanged fire with Comet, Thunder, Savannah, and Venus. The next day the British scuttled Rose, which was leaking badly, just below the town to impede the French vessels from progressing further. They also burnt Savannah and Venus. By scuttling Rose in a narrow part of the channel, the British effectively blocked it. Consequently, the French fleet was unable to assist the American assault.

Germaine took up a position to protect the north side of Savannah's defenses. Comet and Thunder had the mission of opposing any attempt by the South  Carolinian galleys to bombard the town. Over the next few days, British shore batteries assisted Comet and Thunder in engagements with the two South Carolinian galleys; during one of these, they severely damaged Revenge.

The French commander, rejecting the idea of assaulting the British defenses, unloaded cannons from his ships and began a bombardment of the city. The city, rather than the entrenched defenses, bore the brunt of this bombardment, which lasted from October 3 to 8. "The appearance of the town afforded a melancholy prospect, for there was hardly a house that had not been shot through", wrote one British observer.

When the bombardment failed to have the desired effect, d'Estaing changed his mind, and decided it was time to try an assault. He was motivated in part by the desire to finish the operation quickly, as scurvy and dysentery were becoming problems on his ships, and some of his supplies were running low. While a traditional siege operation would likely have succeeded eventually, it would have taken longer than d'Estaing was prepared to stay.

Attack

Against the advice of many of his officers, d'Estaing launched the assault against the British position on the morning of October 9. The success depended in part on the secrecy of some its aspects, which were betrayed to Prevost well before the operations were supposed to begin around 4:00 am. Fog caused troops attacking the Spring Hill redoubt to get lost in the swamps, and it was nearly daylight when the attack finally got underway. The redoubt on the right side of the British works had been chosen by the French admiral in part because he believed it to be defended only by militia. In fact, it was defended by a combination of militia and Scotsmen from John Maitland's 71st Regiment of Foot, Fraser's Highlanders, who had distinguished themselves at Stono Ferry. The militia included riflemen, who easily picked-off the white-clad French troops when the assault was underway. Admiral d'Estaing was twice wounded, and Polish cavalry officer Casimir Pulaski, fighting with the Americans, was mortally wounded. By the time the second wave arrived near the redoubt, the first wave was in complete disarray, and the trenches below the redoubt were filled with bodies. Attacks intended as feints against other redoubts of the British position were easily taken.

The second assault column was commanded by the Swedish Count Curt von Stedingk, who managed to reach the last trench. He later wrote in his journal, "I had the pleasure of planting the American flag on the last trench, but the enemy renewed its attack and our people were annihilated by cross-fire". He was forced back by overwhelming numbers of British troops, left with some 20 men—all were wounded, including von Stedingk. He later wrote, "The moment of retreat with the cries of our dying comrades piercing my heart was the bitterest of my life".

After an hour of carnage, d'Estaing ordered a retreat. On October 17, Lincoln and d'Estaing abandoned the siege.

Aftermath and legacy
The battle was one of the bloodiest of the war. While Prevost claimed Franco-American losses at 1,000 to 1,200, the actual tally of 244 killed, nearly 600 wounded and 120 taken prisoner, was severe enough. British casualties were comparatively light: 40 killed, 63 wounded, and 52 missing. Sir Henry Clinton wrote, "I think that this is the greatest event that has happened the whole war," and celebratory cannons were fired when the news reached London.

It was perhaps because of the siege's reputation as a famous British victory that Charles Dickens chose the siege of Savannah as the place for Joe Willet to be wounded (losing his arm) in the novel Barnaby Rudge.

Three currently-existing Army National Guard units (118th FA,  131st MP and 263rd ADA) are derived from American units that participated in the siege of Savannah. There are only thirty current U.S. Army units with lineages that go back to the colonial era.

Battlefield archaeology
In 2005, archaeologists with the Coastal Heritage Society (CHS) and the LAMAR Institute discovered portions of the British fortifications at Spring Hill, the site of the worst part of the Franco-American attack on October 9. The find represents the first tangible remains of the battlefield. In 2008, the CHS/LAMAR Institute archaeology team discovered another segment of the British fortifications in Madison Square. A detailed report of that project is available on line in pdf format from the CHS website. CHS archaeologists are currently finalizing a follow-up grant project in Savannah, which examined several outlying portions of the battlefield. These included the position of the Saint-Domingue reserve troops at the Jewish Burying Ground west of Savannah.

An archaeology presentation and public meeting took place in February 2011 to gather suggestions for managing Savannah's Revolutionary War battlefield resources. Archaeologist Rita Elliott from the Coastal Heritage Society revealed Revolutionary War discoveries in Savannah stemming from the two "Savannah Under Fire" projects conducted from 2007 to 2011. The projects uncovered startling discoveries, including trenches, fortifications, and battle debris. The research also showed that residents and tourists are interested in these sites. Archaeologists described the findings and explored ways to generate economic income which could be used for improving the quality-of-life of area residents.

The battle is commemorated each year by Presidential proclamation, on General Pulaski Memorial Day.

Influence on Haitian revolutionaries
The battle is much-remembered in Haitian history; the Chasseurs-Volontaires de Saint-Domingue, consisting of some 545 gens de couleur—free men of color from Saint-Domingue—fought with the Americans.

Henri Christophe, who later declared himself to be the king of (northern) Haiti, while a republic was established in southern Haiti, was 12-years old at the time and may have been among these troops.

Many other less-famous individuals from Saint-Domingue served in this regiment and formed the officer class of the rebel armies in the Haitian Revolution, especially in the northern province around today's Cap-Haïtien, where the unit was recruited.

See also
 American Revolutionary War § War in the South. Places ' Siege of Savannah ' in overall sequence and strategic context.
 Casimir Pulaski Monument in Savannah
 William Jasper Monument

Notes

References
 Buker, George E. and Richard Apley Martin (July 1979) "Governor Tonyn's Brown-Water Navy: East Florida during the American Revolution, 1775-1778". Florida Historical Quarterly, Vol. 58, No. 1, pp. 58–71.
 
 Marley, David. Wars of the Americas: A Chronology of Armed Conflict in the New World, 1492 to the PresentABC-CLIO (1998).

External links
 French free colored participation in the Battle of Savannah
 Summary of Archaeological Finds at Springhill Redoubt
 Pictures of the "Chasseurs Volontaires" monument, by James Mastin, located in Franklin Square, Savannah, Georgia
 
 Attack on British Lines historical marker

1779 in the United States
1779 in Georgia (U.S. state)
Conflicts in 1779
Savannah
Savannah
History of Haiti
History of Savannah, Georgia
Savannah
Savannah